Lioscincus steindachneri, also known commonly as the white-lipped forest skink or Steindachner's ground skink, is a species of lizard in the family Scincidae. The species is endemic to New Caledonia.

Etymology
The specific name, steindachneri, is in honor of Austrian herpetologist Franz Steindachner.

Habitat

Reproduction
The mode of reproduction of L. steindachneri is unknown. It may be oviparous or viviparous.

References

Further reading
Bauer AM, Sadlier RA (editors) (2000). The Herpetofauna of New Caledonia. Contributions to Herpetology No. 17. Ithaca, New York: Society for the Study of Amphibians and Reptiles (SSAR). 322 pp. .
Bocage JVB (1873). "Sur quelques Sauriens nouveaux de la Nouvelle Calédonie et de l'Australie". Jornal de Sciencias Mathematicas Physicas e Naturaes, Lisboa [4] (15): 228–232. (Lioscincus steindachneri, new species, pp. 228–229). (in French).
Sadlier RA, Bauer AM, Shea GM, Smith SA (2015). "Taxonomic resolution to the problem of polyphyly in the New Caledonian scincid lizard genus Lioscincus (Squamata: Scincidae)". Records of the Australian Museum 67 (7): 207–224.

Lioscincus
Skinks of New Caledonia
Endemic fauna of New Caledonia
Reptiles described in 1873
Taxa named by José Vicente Barbosa du Bocage